
The market for corporate control is the role of equity markets in facilitating corporate takeovers. This was first described in an article by HG Manne, "Mergers and the Market for Corporate Control". According to Manne:

In this way the market for corporate control could magnify the efficacy of corporate governance rules, and facilitate greater accountability of directors to their investors.

See also

Associate company
Business valuation
Consolidation (business)
Corporate governance
Drag-along right
Minority discount
Minority interest
Pre-emption right
Tag-along right
Voting interest

Notes

References
 Manne, Henry G. (1965). "Mergers and the Market for Corporate Control". 73 Journal of Political Economy 110
 Scharfstein, D. (1988). "The Disciplinary Role of Takeovers". 55 Rev Econ Stud 85

External links
 Encycogov.com's page

Corporate finance
Mergers and acquisitions